Immovable Cultural Heritage of Exceptional Importance (/) are those objects of Immovable cultural heritage that enjoy the highest level of state protection in the Republic of Serbia. Immovable Cultural Heritage is classified as being of Exceptional Importance upon decision by the National Assembly of Serbia. Objects of Immovable cultural heritage have to fulfill one or more of those criteria defined in the Law on Cultural Heritage of 1994 in order to be categorized as being "of exceptional importance":

 exceptional importance for social, historical or cultural development of the people, or for the development of its natural environment;
 evidence of important historic events or persons and their work;
 unique (rare) example of human creativity of the time or a unique example from the natural history;
 great influence on the development of society, culture, technology, or science;
 exceptional artistic or aesthetic value.
According to the Law, there are four classes of Immovable Cultural Heritage: Cultural Monuments, Archaeological Sites, Historic Landmarks and Spatial Cultural-Historical Units. Objects in each of those classes can be categorized as being "of exceptional importance" by the National Assembly.

List of Cultural Heritage of Exceptional Importance 
, there are currently 2592 objects of immovable cultural heritage inscribed in the Central Register, 200 of which are categorized as being "of exceptional importance" (155 cultural monuments, 18 archaeological sites, 16 historic landmarks and 11 spatial cultural-historical units).

Cultural monuments of Exceptional Importance

Archeological Sites of Exceptional Importance

Historic Landmarks of Exceptional Importance

Spatial Cultural-Historical Units of Exceptional Importance

Notes

See also
Immovable Cultural Heritage of Great Importance (Serbia)
Serbian culture
Cultural Heritage of Serbia
List of National Monuments of Bosnia and Herzegovina
 Immovable Cultural Monuments of National Significance (Georgia)

References

External links
Republican Institute for the Protection of Cultural Monuments 
List of cultural monuments in Serbia 

 
Serbian culture
Monuments and memorials in Serbia
Cultural heritage of Serbia
Archaeological Sites of Exceptional Importance
Historic Landmarks of Exceptional Importance
Spatial Cultural-Historical Units of Exceptional Importance